
Giżycko County is a unit of territorial administration and local government (powiat) in Warmian-Masurian Voivodeship, northern Poland. It came into being on 1 January 1999, as a result of the Polish local government reforms of 1998.

As of 2019 its total population is 56,661, out of which the population of Giżycko is 29,335, that of Ryn is 2,851, and the rural population is 24,475.

Until 2002 Giżycko County also included the three gminas which now form Węgorzewo County.

Neighbouring counties
Giżycko County is bordered by Węgorzewo County to the north, Gołdap County to the north-east, Olecko County and Ełk County to the east, Pisz County to the south, and Mrągowo County and Kętrzyn County to the west.

Administrative division
The county is subdivided into six gminas (one urban, one urban-rural and four rural). These are listed in the following table, in descending order of population.

References

 
Land counties of Warmian-Masurian Voivodeship